Trichotosia is a genus of orchids with about 50 species distributed in China, the Himalayas, Southeast Asia (Indonesia, Indochina, Philippines etc.), New Guinea and various islands of the western Pacific (Solomon Islands, Vanuatu, etc.).

References

Podochileae genera
Eriinae